USS Katrina (SP-1144) was a United States Navy patrol vessel in commission from 1917 to 1919.

Katrina was built in 1913 as a private wooden steam yacht of the same name by George Lawley & Son at Neponset, Massachusetts. On 18 May 1917, the U.S. Navy chartered her from her owner, Mrs. Anna C. Ewing of Yonkers, New York, for use as a section patrol boat during World War I. She was commissioned into the United States Naval Reserve on 30 May 1917 as USS Katrina (SP-1144).

Initially assigned to the Bar Harbor Section Patrol at Bar Harbor, Maine, Katrina served on patrol duty, tended lookout stations, and served as an icebreaker. While there, she was placed in full commission on 22 June 1917 and enrolled in the Naval Coast Defense Reserve on 28 July 1917.

Katrina was ordered to Halifax, Nova Scotia, Canada, on 5 June 1918. Arriving there on 11 June 1918, she was used to transport men between visiting ships, the receiving ship, and the station hospital for the remainder of World War I.

The Navy returned Katrina to Ewing on 15 February 1919.

References

Department of the Navy Naval History and Heritage Command Online Library of Selected Images: Civilian Ships: Katrina (Steam Boat, 1913). Served as USS Katrina (SP-1144) in 1917-1919
NavSource Online: Section Patrol Craft Photo Archive Katrina (SP 1144)

Patrol vessels of the United States Navy
World War I patrol vessels of the United States
Ships built in Boston
1913 ships